Satkhira Sadar is an upazila of Satkhira District in the Division of Khulna, Bangladesh.

Geography
It has 61839 households and total area 400.82 km2.

Satkhira Sadar Upazila is bounded by Kalaroa Upazila on the north, Tala Upazila on the east, Debhata and Assasuni upazilas on the south and Basirhat I and Baduria CD Blocks in North 24 Parganas district in West Bengal, India, on the west.

Demographics
According to the 2011 Bangladesh census, Satkhira Sadar had a population of 460,892. Males constituted 50.04% of the population and females 49.96%. Muslims formed 86.82% of the population, Hindus 12.89%, Christians 0.19% and others 0.10%. Satkhira Sadar had a literacy rate of 56.51% for the population 7 years and above.

As of the 1991 Bangladesh census, Satkhira Sadar has a population of 344444. Males constitute 51.3% of the population, and females 48.7%. This Upazila's eighteen up population is 176670. Satkhira Sadar has an average literacy rate of 34.6% (7+ years), and the national average of 32.4% literate.

Administration
Satkhira Sadar Upazila is divided into Satkhira Municipality and 14 union parishads: Agardari, Alipur, Baikari, Balli, Banshdaha, Bhomra , Brahmarajpur, Dhulihar, Fingri, Ghona, Jhaudanga, Kuskhali, Labsa, and Shibpur. The union parishads are subdivided into 119 mauzas and 237 villages.

Satkhira Municipality is subdivided into 9 wards and 33 mahallas.

Transport
There is well established transportation systems from Satkhira to Dhaka also any other districts of Bangladesh. Among them high way service is the best. The intra-district transportation is also developed. But the water transportation system is less familiar than high way service in this district. There is no air service (e.g. aeroplane) in this district.

Education

Primary schools

Shreerampur govt.primary school
Town Government Primary School at Sultanpur
Chupria Primary School
Palashpole Government Primary School
Rasulpur Boys Government Primary School
Kamalnagar Government Primary School
Taltola Government Primary School
Binerpota Government Primary School
Gopinathpur Government Primary School
Khejurdanga Government Primary School
Munsipara Government Primary School
Rajarbagan Government Primary School
Alipore Government Primary School
Beharinagor Primary School
Kataltala Government primary school, Kataltala, 12no bulli union, Satkhira sodor
Jagonnathpur Government primary school
Tujalpur Primary School
Rajnagar Govt. Primary School
Koikhali Primary School
Chawguria Baladanga primary school (Eh.Rubel)
Baladanga Government primary school (Eh.Rubel)
Akhrakhula Government primary school
Raghunathpur Government primary school

Secondary schools 

Satkhira Govt. Technical School

Colleges
United Model College
Jhaudanga College
 Akhrakhula Ideal College
Satkhira City College
Satkhira Day-Night College
Satkhira Government College
Satkhira Government Mahila College
Satkhira Medical College
Satkhira Polytechnic Institute
Shimanta Adarsha College, Mahmudpur
Gava Ideal College
Abdur Rahman Degree College 
Chhafunnesa Mohila College
Satkhira Govt. Technical College

Madrasha

Notable residents
 Mir Mustak Ahamed Robi, Member of Parliament, was elected from constituency Satkhira-2 in the 2014 general election.

See also
Upazilas of Bangladesh
Districts of Bangladesh
Divisions of Bangladesh

References

Upazilas of Satkhira District
Satkhira District
Khulna Division